George Rothera (12 November 1809 – 31 October 1841) was an English cricketer who played first-class cricket from 1832 to 1837. Mainly associated with Nottingham Cricket Club, he made ten known appearances in first-class matches. He represented the North in the North v. South series.

References

1809 births
1841 deaths
English cricketers
English cricketers of 1826 to 1863
North v South cricketers
Cricketers from Nottingham
Nottingham Cricket Club cricketers